Darreh-ye Qila may refer to:
 Darreh-ye Qila Tahemasbi